Biddle House may refer to:

Biddle House (St. Georges, Delaware), listed on the NRHP in New Castle County, Delaware
Perry L. Biddle House, DeFuniak Springs, Florida
Biddle House (Mackinac Island), Michigan

See also
Biddle Memorial Hall, Johnson C. Smith University, Charlotte, North Carolina